For Women Scotland (FWS) is a Scottish campaign group that opposes proposed reforms allowing individuals to change their recorded sex in legal documents by means of self-declaration. The group campaigns against changes to transgender rights and has been described as anti-trans, as trans-exclusionary radical feminist, and as a "gender-critical feminist group".

For Women Scotland says that proposed changes to the Gender Recognition Act 2004 to allow people as young as 16 to change their legal gender through self-identification would erode women's rights and would violate the Equality Act 2010. It also says that it supports legislation to support vulnerable groups, provided existing rights are not affected. The group has stated its beliefs "that there are only two sexes, that a person’s sex is not a choice, nor can it be changed".

Foundation and reception 
The group was established in 2018 "amid growing unease about how women's rights would be affected by the Scottish Government's plans to reform the Gender Recognition Act to allow for self-declaration of sex". The directors of For Women Scotland are Trina Budge, Marion Calder, and Susan Smith. Magdalen Berns was a co-founder.

A theme in an interview study with members of a "Scottish women's cooperative constellation around the issue of GRA reform and its impact on women's sex-based rights", was that organisations like For Women Scotland and Woman and Girls in Scotland were founded because established women's organisations in Scotland, such as Engender, Rape Crisis Scotland, and Zero Tolerance, were "running scared of the debate around GRA reform or actively working against gender-critical women in their support of the Scottish government's plans".

The group has been described as anti-trans and as trans-exclusionary radical feminist.

In November 2021, author J. K. Rowling hailed the group for its support, after trans activists publicised her home address online. She said: "Thank you, my sisters xxx." In October 2022, writing in The Sunday Times, Rowling described For Women Scotland as "a grassroots feminist group that has emerged as a leading voice for Scottish women over the past few years". In December 2022, Rowling announced that Susan Smith would sit on the board of Beira's Place, a "new women-only support service for victims of sexual violence".

First public meeting in Edinburgh 

In February 2019, the group held its first public meeting in Edinburgh. The event attracted an audience of around 150, protested by about 40, and was described by The Guardian as "most public expression in Scotland of increasingly vocal concerns around transgender issues". Susan Smith said:
"We are concerned that the Scottish government is sleepwalking towards a significant erosion of women's rights, both in terms of proposals to reform the GRA to allow self-identification and the failure to prevent other organisations running ahead of the law and adopting policies which are in breach of the Equality Act. We’re not here to quibble about toilets and we’re not here to create trouble for those who have battled crippling gender dysphoria. We welcome extra provisions for other vulnerable groups that don't involve dismantling existing rights. If we cannot see sex, then we cannot see sexism, we cannot define sexuality, and it is the most vulnerable women who will suffer from this."

Critics of the meeting included the Intersectional feminist group Sisters Uncut Edinburgh who said: "While For Women Scot do a sterling job of making transphobia look respectable, their actions and statements do real damage to Scotland's trans and non-binary community."

Hate Crime and Public Order (Scotland) Act 2021 
During proceedings regarding the bill eventually passed as the Hate Crime and Public Order (Scotland) Act 2021, For Women Scotland presented its concerns regarding free speech to the Justice Committee of the Scottish Parliament: the group feared it could be prosecuted over its position on women's rights and transgender people.

Judicial Reviews regarding Women on Public Boards 
In March 2021, the group lost their judicial review at the Court of Session to remove trans women from the definition of "woman" in the Gender Representation on Public Boards (Scotland) Act 2018, a law intended to grow the number of women on public boards. The Scottish Trans Alliance had intervened, describing the case as "hurtful and pointless".

In July 2021, the group announced it would appeal, and in November 2021 the appeal hearing began in the Inner House of the Court of Session. In February 2022, Lady Dorrian found in their favour, ruling that by "incorporating those transsexuals living as women into the definition of woman the 2018 act conflates and confuses two separate and distinct protected characteristics ... Changing the definitions of protected characteristics, even for the purpose of achieving the gender recognition objective is not permitted and in this respect the 2018 act is outwith legislative competence".

In July 2022, the group sought a second judicial review, due to a "reference to the Gender Recognition Act" in revised statutory guidance of April 2022 from the Scottish Ministers on the legislation regarding representation on public boards. On 13 December 2022, the Court of Session dismissed the second judicial review and ruled that the Scottish government’s guidance that "woman" includes a transgender woman with a Gender Recognition Certificate is lawful.

Police investigation involving Marion Millar 
In June 2021, Marion Millar, an accountant from Airdrie who worked for the group as their accountant, was charged in connection with tweets alleged to be homophobic and transphobic, and was interviewed at Coatbridge police station under the Communications Act 2003. A spokesperson for FWS said: "Marion is naturally upset that the police have decided to press ahead with charges. [...] Sadly, in Scotland, it seems both free speech and women's rights are under attack."

In July 2021, FWS organised a rally in support of Marion Millar on Glasgow Green, addressed by Graham Linehan, among others.

On 28 October 2021 the Crown Office discontinued all proceedings against Marion Millar pending a review of the case.

The "Women's Rights Demo" at the Scottish Parliament 
On 1 September 2021, the group organised a demonstration outside the Scottish Parliament, Edinburgh, demanding that the SNP-Green government uphold sex-based rights. Demonstrators called on MSPs to respect women's rights, and single-sex spaces and services, and not to allow men identifying as women to use them. The Herald estimated there were 400 people in the main demo, and 100 at a counter-protest.

Marion Calder of For Women Scotland, said: "They need to understand that women won't wheesht, that they need to consider women's rights within any piece of legislation, especially over the next year, whether it is self-ID, GRA reform, the census, or the impact of the Hate Crime Bill and the chilling effect on women's rights and being unable to speak out."

Provision of Single-Sex Lavatories in Schools 
In June 2022, the group wrote to the 32 Scottish councils asking that they provide single-sex facilities in schools. The letter quotes a legal opinion by Aidan O'Neill QC that gender-neutral facilities breach equality law, and claims that they cause distress to female pupils.

Controversy over Eunuch as a Gender Identity 
In June 2022, the group criticised NHS Scotland for its alignment with the World Professional Association for Transgender Health (WPATH), following the accidental publication on an NHS Scotland website of a Standards of Care document from WPATH that argued for the recognition of eunuch as a gender identity.

Protest against Gender Recognition Form Bill at the Scottish Parliament 
In October 2022, the group organised a protest against the Gender Recognition Reform (Scotland) Bill at the Scottish Parliament. Speakers included Maya Forstater, Helen Joyce, and Johann Lamont. In support, J. K. Rowling said on Twitter that: "I stand in solidarity with For Women Scotland and all women protesting and speaking outside the Scottish parliament. #NoToSelfID." She also tweeted a picture of herself wearing a T-shirt that said, "Nicola Sturgeon . . . destroyer of women's rights". In response, First Minister Nicola Sturgeon said ""I’ve spent my entire life campaigning for women’s rights and I’m a passionate feminist with lots of evidence behind that… The gender recognition bill which comes before the Scottish parliament in a couple of weeks time is about reforming an existing process. It doesn’t give any more rights to trans people, and it doesn’t take any more rights away from women".

Battle of Ideas festival 
In December 2022, the group were criticised by Scottish Green MSP Maggie Chapman after sharing a platform with members of the Scottish Family Party at a Battle of Ideas festival event in Glasgow.

See also 

 Fair Play for Women
 LGB Alliance
 Woman's Place UK

References

Advocacy groups in the United Kingdom
2018 establishments in Scotland
Feminism and transgender
Feminist organisations in Scotland
Organisations that oppose transgender rights in the United Kingdom